Selys Longchamps is a Belgian baronial noble family.

History
In 1656, Michel de Selys, former mayor of Liège, received at the same time as his brothers Hubert and Godefroid, a nobiliary title from Ferdinand III, Holy Roman Emperor. His grandson, Walter de Selys, received in 1699 from Leopold I, Holy Roman Emperor the title of Baron of the Holy Roman Empire, transferable to all legitimate male or female descendants.

Notable members
Edmond de Selys Longchamps, zoologist
Sybille de Selys Longchamps, aristocrat, mother of Princess Delphine of Belgium
Jean de Selys Longchamps, aviator

See also

Compound surnames
French-language surnames
Surnames of French origin